Tribenuron in the form of tribenuron-methyl is a sulfonylurea herbicide. Its mode of action is the inhibition of acetolactate synthase, group 2 of the Herbicide Resistance Action Committee's classification scheme.

Chemistry
In the 1970s, chemists at DuPont worked extensively on sulfonylurea herbicides, following the invention of this class of herbicides by George Levitt which had led to the commercialisation of chlorsulfuron.
Tribenuron (the carboxylic acid) and its methyl ester were first disclosed in general terms in one of Levitt's patents and subsequently the ester was subject to further patenting and selected for development under the code name DPX L5300. In the final step of its synthesis, 2-methoxycarbonylbenzenesulfonyl isocyanate was condensed with 2-methylamino-4-methoxy-6-methyl-1,3,5-triazine to form the sulfonylurea product.

Mode of action
Tribenuron is an herbicide that acts as an acetolactate synthase inhibitor. For the purposes of herbicide resistance management, the Herbicide Resistance Action Committee has placed it in group 2 (legacy HRAC Group B).

Applications

Tribenuron has a broad spectrum of activity on commercially important broadleaf weeds and grasses but at the recommended use rate it is safe to important crops such as wheat. The compound is used mainly in wheat but also in pasture.

Physicochemistry
In a clay-water suspension, tribenuron has increased sorption with decreasing pH and even more so with suspended load.

Resistant crops
A tribenuron-resistance transformation has been achieved in watermelon and validated by survival of the als mutants but not the controls, under tribenuron treatment.

Two oilseed type sunflower cultivars have been produced by USDA-ARS by conventional breeding.

References

Further reading
  Supplemental.

Herbicides
Sulfonylurea herbicides